NuTech may refer to:

NuTech Digital
NuTech Solutions

See also
New Tech (disambiguation)
Nutec
NU-Tech
Nuctech Company
NOTECHS